Wołogoszcz may refer to:

Polish name for Wolgast, Germany
Wołogoszcz, Lubusz Voivodeship, a village in western Poland